The Best of Sepultura is a compilation album from Roadrunner Records, featuring a best of collection of Sepultura's music with the label. Although the track-listing from "Inner Self" onwards is essentially a collection of all of the band's singles, in its representation of the album Arise the compilation substitutes the single "Under Siege (Regnum Irae)" for the album track "Desperate Cry".

The record was released without Sepultura's involvement (they were signed to SPV Records at the time) and is not officially recognized by Sepultura themselves. The Roadrunner studio albums Morbid Visions, Against, Nation, the debut EP Bestial Devastation, and the rarities and live albums Blood-Rooted, The Roots of Sepultura and Under a Pale Grey Sky are not represented on the record (although a version of "Troops of Doom" did originally appear on Morbid Visions and as an outtake from Arise).

The album was released on September 12, 2006, simultaneously with similarly unsanctioned best-of collections of the bands Type O Negative, Fear Factory and Ill Niño.

Track listing

Credits

Sepultura
Max Cavalera - vocals, rhythm guitar, bass on Scizophrenia, Beneath the Remains,  Arise, & Chaos A.D.
Andreas Kisser - lead guitar, bass on Scizophrenia, Beneath the Remains,  Arise, & Chaos A.D.
Paulo Jr. - bass on Roots
Igor Cavalera - drums, percussion

References 

Albums produced by Andy Wallace (producer)
Albums produced by Ross Robinson
Albums produced by Scott Burns (record producer)
2006 greatest hits albums
Sepultura compilation albums
Roadrunner Records compilation albums